Filippo Uttinacci (born 12 September 1997), professionally known as Fulminacci, is an Italian singer-songwriter.
In April 2019, he debuted with the studio album La vita veramente, which was awarded the Targa Tenco for Best Debut Album. He also won the prize for Artist of the Year at the Rockol Awards 2019. 
After performing in several Italian music festivals, he enlarged his popularity in 2021, competing for the first time in the Sanremo Music Festival with the song "Santa Marinella". His second studio album was released shortly after, and became his first top-5 entry on the FIMI Italian Albums Chart.

Biography

Early life
Filippo Uttinacci was born in Rome on 12 September 1997 and grew up in the Casal Lumbroso district. 
His father is a graphic designer, while his mother co-owns a furniture store, together with his aunt. He has a brother.
He attended primary school and middle school at a Catholic institute run by nuns. He later studied at the liceo classico "Dante Alighieri" in the rione Prati in Rome. 
At the age of 10, Fulminacci entered a music school and started to play guitar. Two years later, he also began studying drums. He wrote his first songs at the age 16. He was initially reluctant at singing, but he decided to reveal himself recording the songs he wrote. Encouraged by the positive reaction received by his family, he sent his demos to independent label Maciste Dischi and signed his first recording deal. 
In 2018, he debuted as an actor, starring in the short film Fammi parlare by Luca Iacoella. He also appeared in the music video of the song "In My Mind", recorded for Italian TV series Immaturi.

Music career
His debut single, "Borghese in borghese", was released in January 2019 by Maciste Dischi. He initially decided not to reveal his real name and surname. For that reason, he decided to adopt the stage name "Fulminacci", chosen after brainstorming for something "unexpected and very personal". His pseudonym creates an assonance with his surname, and is typically used as an exclamation in comics.

His second single, "La vita veramente", was released in February 2019, and followed by "Una sera", which was one of the first songs he wrote.
His debut studio album, also titled La vita veramente and featuring all of his previous singles, was released by Maciste Dischi and distributed by Artist First on 9 April 2019. The album was produced by Federico Nardelli and Giordano Colombo. Shortly after the album's release, Fulminacci took part in the 2019 International Worker's Day concert in Piazza San Giovanni Laterano, Rome, annually supported by Italian trade unions CGIL, CISL and UIL. He performed at several Italian music festivals, including the Mi Ami Festival in Milan, the Mind Festival in Montecosaro, the Goa-Boa Festival in Genoa and the Flowers Festival in Turin.

During the summer of 2019, Fulminacci released the music videos for the songs "Resistenza" and "Tommaso", both featured in his debut album. In July 2019, La vita veramente received the Targa Tenco for Best Debut Album.
In December of the same year, he was named Artist of the Year at the Rockol Awards 2019. On 6 December 2019, he also released the vinyl version of his debut album, featuring the singles "Le ruote, i motori" and "San Giovanni".

On 1 May 2020, he performed for the second time at the International Worker's Day concert. As a consequence of the COVID-19 pandemic, the event was adapted to a televised show without any audience, and Fulminacci performed "San Giovanni" from the Audtiorium Parco della Musica in Rome.
On 9 September 2020, Fulminacci released the new single "Canguro", followed by "Un fatto tuo personale" in December of the same year. Both songs were included in Fulminacci's second studio album, Tante care cose, which was released on 12 March 2021, shortly after his appearance at the 71st Sanremo Music Festival. Fulminacci competed in the Big Artists section with the song "Santa Marinella", also released as a single from Tante care cose, and placed 16th in a field of 26.

Personal life
Since 2017, Fulminacci is in a relationship with actress Lia Grieco. Grieco and Uttinacci appeared together on the music video for "In My Mind". She also appeared in the video of Fulminacci's single "Tommaso".
He is a supporter of A.S. Roma.

Discography

Studio albums

Singles

As lead artist

Featured singles

Other certified songs

Other album appearances

Awards and nominations

References

External links

 
 

Italian male singer-songwriters
Living people
21st-century Italian male singers
1997 births
Singers from Rome